Solo: A Star Wars Story (Original Motion Picture Soundtrack) is the soundtrack album to the 2018 film of the same name directed by Ron Howard, which is the second instalment in the Star Wars anthology series. The score is composed by John Powell, with the Han Solo's theme conducted and composed by John Williams, whom he had collaborated for several Star Wars films, was included in the album. Williams further composed several demos, that were not included in the soundtrack but was released in the deluxe edition. Besides, composing the original themes, Powell also incorporated Williams' music from Star Wars films.

Walt Disney Records released the soundtrack album on May 25, 2018, and debuted at third position on soundtracks chart from UK's Official Charts Company. It further received positive response and Powell won the Film Music Composition of the Year award by the International Film Music Critics Association. It was followed by a deluxe edition release on November 20, 2020, that featured Williams' additional cues and unedited demos from the score, and a 4-LP vinyl album was published by Mondo in January 2021.

Development 

In July 2017, John Powell was announced as the main composer of the score, and he began writing the music in late-2017 after finishing his work on Ferdinand. In December of 2017, longtime Star Wars composer John Williams began working on the film score, in addition to Powell's compositions. Williams wrote two musical pieces: "Han hero" and "Han searching theme," and combined them to create the main theme for Han Solo – "The Adventures of Han". In addition to the theme, he wrote several pieces, but they were not featured in the soundtrack in their entirety. His demos were recorded with the Recording Arts Orchestra of Los Angeles at the Newman Scoring Stage the following month.

Powell started composing the instrumental cues in mid-January 2018. Some of the original tracks he composed include: a romantic theme revolving around Han and Qi’ra;  a friendship theme for Han and Chewbacca; another theme for Han's mentor Beckett and his gang; a choral piece for the Marauders; a theme for L3-37, droid companion to Lando Calrissian; and a few other minor motifs. Powell interpolated Williams' new theme into his score, as well as incorporating music by Williams from previous Star Wars films, including the Star Wars main title, and several motifs and cues from A New Hope, The Empire Strikes Back and The Phantom Menace. Powell stated, "I tried to keep in mind the DNA of how John writes, which is flow and polyphony and melody, and of course an incredibly interesting rhythmic use of the orchestra".

Recording of the score began during mid-March at the Abbey Road Studios, with a 98-piece orchestra conducted by Andrew Mackay. Later that following month, he went to Sofia, Bulgaria to record a choral portion with 36 members from the Bulgarian women's choir, as they offered "an aggressive, exotic sound" for the Marauders, in order to feel like a different culture had arrived on the scene. Besides working on the score, Powell wrote and recorded a song that was used as a background lounge piece titled "Chicken in a Pot." The lyrics he wrote were translated into Huttese, a language invented by sound designer Ben Burtt for the original Star Wars trilogy.

Reception 
Critical response to the soundtrack were positive. Filmitracks.com commented "Solo: A Star Wars Story is not only a masterpiece equal to or exceeding the first two How to Train Your Dragon scores, but it could rank highly on some lists of the best all-time "Star Wars" scores [...] Powell proves here that finding the right balance is not a lost cause. The amount of density in this music is astounding, its detailed counterpoint lines, expert orchestration, and outstanding mix all contributing to an immensely entertaining result. There are simply too many fine touches in this score to do it justice in any review, leaving the music as a top recommendation on album for all film music enthusiasts." The website also published the review for the deluxe edition, and said "an exemplary presentation that provides the full score as a faithful representation of what's heard in the film, even if a few overlays of embellishment remain. The four source-like tracks may have been better placed in a bonus section at the end, but Powell seemed intent on preserving the exact chronological presentation." Movie Wave, wrote "The album goes heavy on action – there is a fair bit of unreleased music in the film and not much of it is action – so perhaps it’s a bit unbalanced, but it is just incredibly exciting.  The new Williams material is excellent, the way Powell uses it (and the classic themes) truly impressive – and I really rather admire that he went so much his own way with the score [...] The album is a real thrill-ride and will bring repeated massive smiles to the faces of both Star Wars fans and John Powell fans." Zanobard Reviews wrote, Solo: A Star Wars Story is the perfect Star Wars score that fans have been waiting for".

Track listing

Deluxe edition 
In September 2020, Powell announced on social media that a deluxe edition of the soundtrack album would be remixed and mastered by 5 Cat Studios, featuring all unedited cues from the score and additional demos that Williams had composed for the film. The deluxe edition was released by Walt Disney Records on November 20, 2020, featuring an additional 40 minutes of previously unreleased music.

Vinyl release 
On November 25, 2020, Mondo has announced a four-disc LP album, pressed on 180-grams "hyperspace" and "gram-black" vinyl, featured artwork by César Moreno and additional liner notes. The four-disc set were priced $35.00 and pre-orders for the sets began on December 2, before being published on January 1, 2021. The vinyl discs, contain scores from the original soundtrack, while the additional cues were not featured, though being featured in the deluxe edition of the soundtrack. A press release from Mondo said:"The origin story of science-fiction's greatest rogue is a Star Wars story through and through: a rollicking adventure, full of humor and suspense - and in the grand tradition of franchise, features an epic sweeping score worthy of the biggest screen (or, in this case, speakers) imaginable. John Williams' new 'The Adventures of Han Theme' kicks things off in a spectacular fashion, setting the tone for a fantastic original score by John Powell, only the third composer to ever tackle the film series in its 40+ year legacy, to enter the Star Wars canon."

Chart performance

Accolades

References 

2018 soundtrack albums
Star Wars film soundtracks
Walt Disney Records soundtracks
John Powell (film composer) soundtracks
John Williams soundtracks